The Beardmore W.B.IV was a British single-engine biplane ship-based fighter of World War I developed by Beardmore. Only one was built.

Development and design
The W.B.IV was designed to meet Admiralty Specification N.1A for a naval land- or ship-based fighter aircraft. The design was dominated by the demands for the aircraft to be able to be safely ditching and remain afloat. A large permanent flotation chamber was built into the fuselage under the nose and the pilot was in a watertight cockpit. The propeller shaft ran underneath the cockpit from the Hispano-Suiza V-8 engine which was over the centre of gravity of the aircraft. The entire undercarriage could be released from the plane for water landings. The wing tips were fitted with additional floats, while the aircraft's two-bay wings could fold for storage on board ship.

The single prototype first flew at Beardmore's Dalmuir factory on 12 December 1917, being delivered for evaluation at Martlesham Heath in July 1918. The W.B.IV had poorer performance than the much simpler and smaller shipborne version of the Sopwith Camel and was not developed further. The sole prototype was lost when it sank during ditching.

Specifications

References

External links
picture in 1965 edition of Flight

Mid-engined aircraft
1910s British fighter aircraft
W.B.IV
Carrier-based aircraft
Aircraft first flown in 1917
Biplanes